Juan Agustín Rafael Pinochet Cáceres (11 October 1898, in Quillota – 11 June 1989, in Quillota) was a Chilean politician.

Son of Agustín Pinochet and Joaquina Cáceres, Pinochet Cáceres first worked as independent worker.

Member of the Conservative Party, in 1932 he was elected to the 1933-1937 legislature of the Chilean Chamber of Deputies, representing the Sixth Departmental Grouping "Quillota and Valparaíso". In the Chamber of Deputies, he was member of the Standing Committee on Agriculture and Colonization. 

He also was candidate in the 1937 Chilean parliamentary election, without success.

He also served as Mayor of Quillota and Governor of the Quillota Province.

References 

1898 births
1989 deaths
Mayors of places in Chile
Governors of provinces of Chile
Members of the Chamber of Deputies of Chile
Conservative Party (Chile) politicians
Rafael